General elections were held in the Pitcairn Islands on 8 December 2008.

Electoral system
The four elected members of the Island Council were elected by single transferable vote for two year terms. In addition, the Council had six other members; the Mayor and the Deputy Mayor, both of whom were elected separately. The four elected members and the Deputy Mayor nominated a further member, whilst two were appointed by the Governor and one seat was reserved for a Commissioner liaising between the Governor and the Council.

Results
Jay Warren was elected Deputy Mayor, whilst Turi Griffiths, Brenda Christian, Dave Brown and Jacqui Christian were elected to the Island Council.

References

Pitcairn
Elections in the Pitcairn Islands
General election
Pitcairn general election,2008
Pitcairn
December 2008 events in Oceania